Trespaderne is a town and municipality located in the province of Burgos, Castile and León, Spain.  According to the 2004 census (INE), the municipality has a population of 1,049 inhabitants.

References

External links
Trespaderne City Hall
Aerial view of Trespaderne

Municipalities in the Province of Burgos